The 2005–06 season are the Esteghlal Football Club's 5th season in the Iran Pro League, and their 12th consecutive season in the top division of Iranian football. They are also competing in the Hazfi Cup and 61st year in existence as a football club.

Club

Kit 

|
|
|}

Coaching staff

Other information

Player
As of 1 September 2013. Esteghlal F.C. Iran Pro League Squad 2005–06

Competitions

Overall

Iran Pro League

Standings

Results summary

Results by round

Matches

Hazfi Cup

See also
 2005–06 Iran Pro League
 2005–06 Hazfi Cup

References

External links
Iran Premier League Statistics
Persian League

2005-06
Iranian football clubs 2005–06 season